The Gardner Pinnacles are two barren rock outcrops surrounded by a reef and located in the Northwestern Hawaiian Islands at .

The Gardner Pinnacles were discovered and named in 1820 by the whaling ship Maro. The island may be the last remnant of one of the largest volcanoes on Earth.

History
 
The Gardner Pinnacles were first discovered on June 2, 1820, by the American whaler Maro, commanded by Captain Joseph Allen.

In 1859, the position of the Gardner Pinnacles was determined by the survey schooner USS Fenimore Cooper.

The Gardner Pinnacles are home to the Giant Opihi (Cellana talcosa), Hawaiian Limpet known as the ‘opihi ko‘ele, which is not found anywhere else in the world outside the Hawaiian Islands. Numerous insects live on the island.

In 1903 the Gardner Pinnacles became a part of the Hawaiian Islands Bird Reservation. In 1940 it became a part of the Hawaiian Island's National Wildlife Refuge. In the 21 century it is part of Papahānaumokuākea Marine National Monument wildlife refuge.

The Gardner Pinnacles were used as an emergency helicopter landing spot for the Hawaiian HIRAN project, an effort to determine the locations of area islands with great precision for navigational purposes.  In the Hawaiian Archipelago, adjacent islands/reefs are French Frigate Shoals to the southeast, and Maro Reef to the northwest.

Geology

The island is made up of basalt rock, which comes from lava. The rock is dark grey and dense.

According to a 2020 report in Earth and Planetary Science Letters,  Pūhāhonu contains approximately 150,000 cubic kilometers of rock, based on a 2014 sonar survey. This would make it Earth's largest single volcano. Only about one-third of that volume is exposed above the sea floor while the rest is buried beneath a ring of debris, broken coral, and other material that has eroded from the peak. By comparison, from sea floor to peak, Mauna Kea, on Hawaii's Big Island, is the tallest shield volcano on Earth, but it is nowhere near as massive as Pūhāhonu. Another volcano on the Big Island is Mauna Loa, a 2013 study estimates Mauna Loa's volume at 83,000 cubic kilometers. Pūhāhonu is so heavy, researchers note, that it has caused Earth's crust nearby—and thus the volcano itself—to sink hundreds of meters over millions of years. The Puhahonu volcano (Gardner) would be twice as big as Mauna Loa's based on that research.

Ecology
The island has one plant known to grow on it, the succulent sea purslane. However, there are over a dozen species of bird observed here, many nesting. There is also a variety of insect species on the island.

In the surrounding waters there is variety of sealife, which is noted as habitat for a limpet, the giant ophi which lives in tidal areas of the rocky island. There are many species of fish and coral life in the nearby waters.

The large numbers of birds have coated many surfaces of the island in guano, giving it a whitish appearance.

Some of the fish species in the nearby waters include red lip parrotfish, doublebar goatfish, and reef triggerfish.

Name

The name Gardner comes from its discovery in 1820, when the Captain Joseph Allen of the ship Maro named it Gardner's Island. They also discovered Maro Reef, which is named for that sailing ship.

It has sometimes been called Gardner Rock or Gardner Island, besides the Gardner Pinnacles.

The Hawaiian name, Pūhāhonu, means 'turtle surfacing for air', from pūhā 'to breathe at the surface' and honu 'turtle'.

See also
List of volcanoes in the Hawaiian – Emperor seamount chain
Nikumaroro (aka Gardner Island)

Notes

References

External links 

Gardner Pinnacles Islands of the Hawaiian Chain
Gardner Pinnacles Page ~ Bishop Museum
Quick Facts on the Gardner Pinnacles – from the PBS Ocean Adventures
Papahānaumokuākea Marine National Monument Information Management System
Gardner Pinnacles (Pūhāhonu)

Northwestern Hawaiian Islands
Hawaiian–Emperor seamount chain
Rock formations of Hawaii
Miocene volcanoes
Paleogene Oceania
Cenozoic Hawaii
Stacks of the United States
Important Bird Areas of Hawaii